More Khunda is a town in Punjab, Pakistan. The town is known for its rice market. Within the town, Mangtanwala village has fertile land and rich from rice and wheat crops. A canal also flows in the city. It was established in 1960. The city has advanced hospitals.

.The city is located in two National Assembly regions and two provincial assembly regions as NA-118 and PP-134.
The town got the name khunda from the instrument called khunda (a T shaped instrument used by local blacksmiths). The main courtyard of town is T shaped because of which it is called khunda. 
In 1960's when the town started developing, it  just had a bus stop and some tea corners and cigarette shops near the bus stop and also some commission shops. But slowly that small bus stop started developing due to being on the national high way. Early that road was barren and  desolate. But then the road was rebuilt and became national high way and the bus stops and small villages got importance. Among all those small villages and bus stops more khunda developed the most because it is located on the two most busy roads of region, one lahore-jaranwala road and more khunda-bhai pheru road. 
Moreover, another reason for the development of town is that it is located near to the provincial tourist spot of head balloki.

Famous Park Rana Resorts 11 km from more khunda at Head balloki.

Founder of Sikhism Baba Guru Nank Gurdawara 21 km from More khunda Nankana sahib.He was born in 15 April 1469 in village Rai bhoi di Talwandi near More khunda District Nankna sahib.

Rai Bahadur Sir Ganga Ram Belong More khunda he was born in small village  Mangtawala on 13 April 1851 near More khunda district nankana sahib.One and only Cricket player from Nankana sahib at international level Muhammad Ayub(Pakistani cricketer ) belong to more khunda district Nankana sahib first and only one test played for Pakistan vs Sri Lanka in 2012.first class cricketer Rana Omais (Muhammad Azeem) belong to city more khunda he was played a first and only match for multan tiger in 2013

References

Populated places in Nankana Sahib District